The following is a summary of Donegal county football team's 2023 season.

Personnel changes
Neil McGee retired from inter-county football at the end of the 2022 season with a record 195 appearances for the team, announcing his decision, shortly before his 37th birthday, in an exclusive interview given to Frank Craig and published in the Donegal News on 29 September 2022.

Paddy Carr was announced as manager on 24 October, succeeding Declan Bonner, with Aidan O'Rourke joining as head coach at the same time.

Michael Murphy, who had captained his county since the 2011 season, announced his retirement from inter-county football on 16 November 2022. He released a statement via the county board. Murphy's retirement, at the age of 33, was unexpected.

Competitions

2023 National Football League Division 1

Donegal begin with a home fixture against 2022 league and 2022 All-Ireland champions Kerry.

Table

Fixtures

Ulster Senior Football Championship

The draw for the 2023 Ulster Championship was made on 15 October 2022.

Bracket

Fixtures

References

Donegal
Donegal county football team seasons